Philip Henry Wicksteed (25 October 1844 – 18 March 1927) is known primarily as an economist. He was also a Georgist,
Unitarian theologian, classicist, medievalist, and literary critic.

Family background
He was the son of Charles Wicksteed (1810–1885) and his wife Jane (1814–1902), and was named after his distant ancestor, Philip Henry (1631–1696), the Nonconformist clergyman and diarist.

His father was a clergyman within the same tradition of English Dissent. His mother was born into the Lupton family, a socially progressive, politically active dynasty of businessmen and traders, long established in Leeds, a city both prosperous and squalid with the rapid growth of the Industrial Revolution. In 1835 Wicksteed had taken up the ministry of the Unitarian place of worship, Mill Hill Chapel, right on the city's central square, and two years later the couple married. In 1841 his sister Elizabeth married Jane's brother Arthur (1819–1867), also a Unitarian minister; Uncle Arthur was, according to a family history, "The Achilles of the Leeds Complete Suffrage Association", in other words, a tragic champion of the fight for universal suffrage; see Chartism and Henry Vincent for more on the CSA. One of their children, a first cousin to Philip, was the maverick MP and mining engineer Arnold Lupton. Jane was described as impractical but accomplished (sketching, painting, reciting poetry etc.) and both the Wicksteed siblings as "Unitarians of vigorous mind and keen intelligence".

Philip was one of nine children, including Janet, who wrote, as Mrs Lewis, a memoir including her parents; (Joseph) Hartley, president of the Institute of Mechanical Engineers; and Charles, also an engineer. One of his nieces was Mary Cicely Wicksteed, who married the prominent Australian surgeon Sir Hibbert Alan Stephen Newton (1887–1949)

Education 
Wicksteed was educated at University College, London and Manchester New College, the seminary for nonconformist ministers. In 1867 he received his master's degree with a gold medal in classics. Following his father into the Unitarian ministry that year, Wicksteed embarked on an extraordinarily broad range of scholarly and theological explorations.

His theological and ethical writings continued long after he left the pulpit (in 1897), and appear to have been a starting point for many of his other fields of scholarly inquiry. These included his interest in Dante,  which not only produced a remarkable list of publications, but also built Wicksteed's reputation as one of the foremost medievalists of his time. Inspired by his reading of Henry George's 1879 book Progress and Poverty, Wicksteed's theologically driven interest in the ethics of modern society, appear to have led him into his economic studies.

Perhaps it was just by circumstance that economics entered Wicksteed's field of scholarly vision, as only one of a number of areas of his interest (to most of which he was committed for years before he began his economics) and in the middle of the fourth decade of his life. This led Joseph Schumpeter to remark that Wicksteed "stood somewhat outside of the economics profession".

Yet, within a few years Wicksteed was to publish significant economic work of his own, carefully expounding on the theory he learned from William Stanley Jevons, and to become for many years a lecturer on economics for the University of London extension lectures (a kind of adult education program initiated in the 1870s to extend "the teaching of the universities, to serve up some of the crumbs from the university tables, in a portable and nutritious form, for some of the multitude who had no chance of sitting there").

In 1894, Wicksteed published his celebrated An Essay on the Co-ordination of the Laws of Distribution, in which he sought to prove mathematically that a distributive system which rewarded factory owners according to marginal productivity would exhaust the total product produced. But it was his 1910 The Common Sense of Political Economy which most comprehensively presents Wicksteed's economic system. The 1932 work by Lionel Robbins, An Essay on the Nature and Significance of Economic Science, picked up and developed his ideas.

Personal life

Wicksteed married Emily Solly, a daughter of Henry, a Unitarian minister and social reformer. The library of University College London contains correspondence between Emily and Maria Sharpe Pearson, the wife of Karl Pearson.

Wicksteed was a staunch opponent of vivisection. He became an associate of Frances Power Cobbe and supported the anti-vivisection movement.

Selected publications

Memorials of the Rev. Charles Wicksteed (1886)
Mr. Wicksteed on Vivisection (1889)
Vivisection: An Address
The Common Sense of Political Economy (1910)
The Reactions Between Dogma & Philosophy (1920)

References

Sources
 Ian Steedman (1987). "Wicksteed, Philip Henry,"  The New Palgrave: A Dictionary of Economics, pp. 919–15.
  reprinted in 1933,  L. Robbins, ed., Clifton NJ: Augustus M. Kelley Publishers
  (1955) The Alphabet of Economic Science, New York City NY: Kelley & Millman, Inc.
  (1914). “The Scope and Method of Political Economy in the Light of the ‘Marginal’ Theory of Value and Distribution”, Economic Journal, 24(94), pp. 1–23 (reprinted in Wicksteed, 1933).

External links

 
 
 
 The Common Sense of Political Economy, Vol. I and Vol. II

1844 births
1927 deaths
Alumni of Harris Manchester College, Oxford
Alumni of University College London
Anti-vivisectionists
English economists
English Unitarians
Georgist economists
Neoclassical economics
Neoclassical economists
Translators of Dante Alighieri